Hyblaea hypocyanea is a moth in the family Hyblaeidae described by Swinhoe in 1895.

References

Hyblaeidae